Lake Hawdon is a small high country lake in Canterbury, New Zealand.

The lake lies approximately 130 kilometres to the northwest of Christchurch, and is one of a series of lakes which make up part of the Waimakariri River system, along with the nearby Lake Marymere, which lies immediately to the south. The waters from Marymere flow into Hawdon, which has an outflow to the Slovens Stream, a tributary of the Broken River (itself a tributary of the Waimakariri). Immediately to the west of the lake is the peak of Mount St Bernard.

The lake is a popular fly fishing site for both brown and rainbow trout.

The small settlement of Craigieburn is immediately to the east of the lake. Access is via a walking track off Craigieburn Road.

The lake was named after Joseph Hawdon, a colonial land owner in Canterbury during the 19th century.

References

Hawdon